Allstedt is a town in the district of Mansfeld-Südharz, in Saxony-Anhalt, Germany. It is situated approximatively 10 km southeast of Sangerhausen.

History

Allstedt is mentioned as the tithable place Altstedi in Friesenfeld in the Hersfeld Tithe Register, created between 881 and 899.

Within the German Empire (1871–1918), Allstedt was part of the Grand Duchy of Saxe-Weimar-Eisenach.

In 2010 Allstedt absorbed 12 former municipalities, that became subdivisions of the town.

Geography 
The town Allstedt consists of the following 13 Ortschaften or municipal divisions:

Allstedt
Beyernaumburg
Emseloh
Holdenstedt
Katharinenrieth
Liedersdorf
Mittelhausen
Niederröblingen
Nienstedt
Pölsfeld
Sotterhausen
Winkel
Wolferstedt

Notable residents

 Johann Karl Wilhelm Voigt (1752–1821), mineralogist 
 Adolph Schmidt (1815–1903), jurist
 Otto Piltz (1846–1910), painter

 Melchior Acontius, humanist and poet (1515–1569 in Allstedt)
 Gottfried Arnold, Lutheran theologian, (1700–1704) court preacher in Allstedt
 Johann Wolfgang von Goethe, (1749–1832), acted several years at Castle Allstedt
 Thomas Müntzer, (c. 1489 – 1525), acted in 1523–1525 Allstedt

References 

 
Castles in Saxony-Anhalt
Mansfeld-Südharz
Grand Duchy of Saxe-Weimar-Eisenach